, also known as Z/X Zillions of enemy X, is a collectible card game produced by Nippon Ichi Software and Broccoli. It is marketed as the first "free" collectible card game, with a free deck offered to players at card shops and events in Japan. A PlayStation 3 game titled Z/X Zillions of enemy X: Zekkai no Crusade, developed by Nippon Ichi Software and produced by Broccoli was released in Japan on May 23, 2013. A manga adaptation written by Broccoli with art by Karegashi Tsuchiya began serialization in Shueisha's V Jump from September 2012. A 12-episode anime television series adaptation titled Z/X Ignition aired between January 9, 2014 and March 27, 2014.

A new anime series was announced in February 2015, which was later revealed to be an adaptation of a new manga series titled Z/X Code reunion. It is written by Tatsuhiko Urahata with art by Takuya Fujima, and it began serialization in V Jump from September 2017. The anime adaptation is produced by Passione and aired between October 8, 2019 and December 24, 2019. The anime is licensed in North America by Sentai Filmworks.

Characters

Anime characters

The main protagonist of Z/X: Ignition. He is kind and helpful, and lives in the dorm of his school. He captures the wounded angel Fierte with his card device which he got from a shrine priestess.

 Ayase is from the Black World and is half-Japanese and half-German. Her parents were brutally murdered by White World's angels so she decided to help the Black World out of revenge. 

The main protagonist of Z/X: Code Reunion. Azumi is from the Blue World. She was on the verge of death due to an unknown disease but her life was extended with the help of the Blue World's technology. In exchange, she has to fight together with others against the other worlds. She is a shy character but she has a very strong will to live, especially since she already came so close to death before. Her Z/X is Rigel.

Alexander's strategist, from the Red World. He protects Sera because she reminds him of his younger sister.

Chitose is from the Green World and was a former member of the Self-Defence Force. She has a soft-hearted nature even towards the monsters who are supposed to be her enemies. 

Sera is from the Red World, she lost her mother who was a reporter by the Z/X but she believes she's still alive and wants to find her. Her Z/X is Orichalcum Tyranno.

Misaki is one of the main protagonists in Z/X -Zillions of enemy X-.

Asuka's classmate, she also lost her parents to the Z/X and has an unconscious hatred towards them. This hatred was the reason why the Z/X Audium manipulated her.

 An Angel who was wounded by Ayase. Asuka protected her from Angel killer Ayase and later captured by Asuka. 

Ayase's Z/X. A giant flying Panther from the Black World. He is brutal and bloodthirsty. Tries to peep Ayase from time to time.

Azumi's Z/X, a Sword Sniper from the Blue World. She wishes to save Azumi at all costs, even going against the will of her world. 

One of the nine worthies. Alexander is trying to conquer the world with his strategist Mikado.

A Samurai from the Green World and Chitose's Z/X.

One on the Twelve Apostles from the White World, she is the Angel who ordered the murder of every person in Ayase's village, for the only reason of covering the fact that an Angel accidentally killed someone.

Gambiel's helper.

One of the archangels from White World heaven.

Another one of the archangels from White World heaven, his servant killed few of heaven's soldiers who saw Fierte on earth to restrain them from telling to Michael that they saw her. 

He is the one of the Guardians of the White World. He opposed Gambiel in her plan of murdering the innocent people of Ayase's village from the beginning and defied his orders by rescuing Ayase from his own kind. He is Misaki's Z/X.

Other characters

Video game characters

Media

Manga

Anime
A 12-episode anime television series adaptation titled Z/X Ignition aired between January 9, 2014 and March 27, 2014.

A new anime adaptation was announced in February 2015. It was later revealed at the Z/Xtreme 2017 Autumn event on September 17, 2017 to be an adaptation of a new manga series titled Z/X Code reunion. It is animated by Passione and aired between October 8, 2019 and December 24, 2019.

Video games
A PlayStation 3 game titled  published by Nippon Ichi Software was released on May 23, 2013; a PlayStation Vita version was also announced but ultimately canceled. A mobile game titled Z/X Code OverBoost was released on iOS and Android devices on October 8, 2019 and will end service on July 20, 2020.

Notes

References

External links
 
 
 

2014 anime television series debuts
2019 anime television series debuts
2013 video games
Digital collectible card games
Card games in anime and manga
Collectible card games
Discotek Media
Japan-exclusive video games
Nippon Ichi Software games
Passione (company)
PlayStation 3 games
PlayStation 3-only games
Sentai Filmworks
Shōnen manga
Shueisha manga
Shueisha franchises
TMS Entertainment
Video games developed in Japan
Broccoli (company) games